Free Fall is a 2013 German drama film directed by Stephan Lacant who also wrote the script with Karsten Dahlem, and starring Hanno Koffler, Max Riemelt, and Katharina Schüttler. The film tells the story of police officer, Marc Borgmann (Koffler), who lives with his pregnant girlfriend, Bettina Bischoff (Schüttler). Whilst on a training course, Borgmann meets fellow police officer, Kay Engel (Riemelt), and a romance develops between the two men. Borgmann is torn between his love for Bettina and his new found feelings for another man. When Engel disappears for a while, Borgmann realises his life is rapidly going into "free fall", as he cannot meet the high expectations of the people he knows.

Filming began in Ludwigsburg, Germany, in the summer of 2012. Freier Fall has been compared to Brokeback Mountain and received good reviews following its première at the Berlin Film Festival on 8 February 2013, and at the Frameline Film Festival in the United States on 21 June 2013. The original motion picture soundtrack written by music duo Dürbeck & Dohmen was released digitally online by MovieScore Media to coincide with the film's opening release on 23 May 2013. It made a box office gross of $599,721.

A sequel, Free Fall 2 (German: Freier Fall 2), is about to be produced , provided the related crowdsourcing project is funded.

Plot
Marc Borgmann (Koffler), a young police officer, is on a training course for the riot control unit. He is struggling at the police academy, being somewhat behind his peers in his physical training. Cocky and self-assured, Marc does not initially get along with his roommate at the academy, Kay Engel (Riemelt). They have a physical confrontation during a training exercise, but afterwards Marc apologizes for his aggressive behavior and they become friends. The two begin jogging together regularly, and during one jog, Kay kisses Marc as they share a marijuana cigarette. Marc, taken aback, is reassured by Kay that it's just a joke. Marc is reluctant to jog again due to his own apparent conflicted attraction to Kay, but on Kay's insistence he goes on a run alone; Kay catches up to him, and, despite Marc's initial resistances, the two kiss and Kay gives him a handjob. Marc initially accepts the advances, but then runs away in confusion.

Kay is later transferred into Marc's police unit to fill a vacancy, where Marc finds it difficult to ignore him. Eventually Kay shows up with a colleague to a bowling alley where Marc and his family are having a game and is introduced to Bettina, Marc's pregnant longtime girlfriend. Marc attempts to stay committed to Bettina and forget about Kay, but he is unable to ignore his feelings and goes back to the jogging trail, where Kay is waiting. The two have sex in the rain. The encounter makes Marc late for a maternity exercise with Bettina, who grows suspicious of Marc's activities. Meanwhile, Marc continues to have intimate encounters with Kay, spending nights with him under the guise of having night shifts, and Kay gives him a key to his apartment. Marc finds himself less able to sexually perform with Bettina, which he explains is only due to her pregnancy.

Marc and Kay later go to a gay bar, where Marc takes ecstasy. The next morning, Bettina rebuffs his advances and asks him if he's seeing another woman, to which Marc responds that he's not. Bettina goes through Marc's phone while Marc is shaving and finds nothing suspicious other than recent calls from Kay. Eventually Bettina gives birth to their son, and Marc tries to cut Kay out his life; however, Kay attempts to contact Marc, leading to a physical altercation with Marc demanding to be left alone.

Marc finds his unit being lectured on acceptance, and that discrimination will not be tolerated; he finds out that Kay was discovered at a gay bar that the unit raided. He then shows up at Kay's apartment and tells him that he didn't ask for Kay to come in and screw up his life. His conflicted jealousy causes him to accuse Kay of going to the bar to find other men to sleep with. Kay calls Marc selfish, only thinking of himself and never of his lover, but says he loves him and that he isn't sleeping with anyone else. Marc tries to leave but breaks down in Kay's arms and the two share an intimate kiss.

Later, Kay attacks his fellow officer Limpinski, following a homophobic incident. Marc gets hit in an attempt to separate the two. Kay visits Marc in the hospital, and though Marc tells him to leave before his mother arrives, the two end up sharing a passionate kiss that Marc's mother ends up witnessing. After Marc catches up to her, they have an argument and Marc leaves alone. Later, Kay arrives at a party after Bettina's invite, where Marc's parents tell him to stay away from Marc due to his new family. Marc, overhearing the conversation, tells him to leave.

Marc visits Kay at his apartment to find Kay's face bruised following an altercation with Limpinski. Marc advises him to transfer to another unit to protect himself, and Kay asks about the future of their relationship. Marc returns the key to his apartment and departs. He returns home to find Bettina packing to leave with their son; she has learned that he has been lying about working night shifts and wants him gone by the time she has returned, questioning Marc's friendship with Kay. Marc does not admit to his romantic relationship with Kay. Marc tries to see her at Frank's house, and admits to her his affair with Kay.

She eventually returns to the house with their son, but there is emotional distance between them. Marc tries to visit Kay at his apartment to find it empty; Kay has moved, also departing from the unit without notice. When Limpinski tries to goad Marc about his relationship with Kay, Marc taunts him, leading Limpinski to assault him. Frank witnesses this and implies that Limpinski will be let go for this. Marc, unhappy, visits the gay bar alone, and though he seeks a sexual encounter with another man, he ends up rebuffing him. Back at the house, Marc and Bettina admit to each other that they can't see their relationship going on as before. The film concludes with Marc at the academy, on a jog with his peers as in the first scene of the film; he outpaces them and runs ahead, alone.

Cast
 Hanno Koffler as Marc Borgmann
 Max Riemelt as Kay Engel
 Katharina Schüttler as Bettina Bischoff
 Oliver Bröcker as Frank Richter 
 Stephanie Schönfeld as Claudia Richter 
 Britta Hammelstein as Britt Rebmann 
 Shenja Lacher as Gregor Limpinski 
 Maren Kroymann as Inge Borgmann 
 Louis Lamprecht as Wolfgang Borgmann 
 Vilmar Bieri as Lothar Bischoff 
 Attila Borlan as Werner Brandt 
 Horst Krebs as Bernd Eiden 
 Samuel Schnepf as Benno Borgmann

Awards and nominations
 2013: Won Best Film during Philadelphia QFest 2013 (Stephan Lacant and Kurhaus Production)
 2013: Won Best Director for Stephan Lacant during Schwerin Art of Film Festival 2013
 2013: Won Best Director and Producer for Hanno Koffler and Max Riemelt during Günter-Rohrbach-Filmpreis 2013
 2013: Nomination for MFG Star Baden-Baden for Stephan Lacant and Kurhaus Production during Fernsehfilmfestival Baden-Baden 
 2013: Nomination for Best Film and Jury Awards during Berlinale 2013
 2014: Nomination for Best Actor in a Secondary Role for Hanno Koffler during Deutscher Filmpreis 2014

Soundtrack 

Free Fall: Original Soundtrack was composed by Dürbeck & Dohmen, and released via digital download by MovieScore Media and AWAL on 21 May 2013.

Sequel
On May 19, 2015, Max Riemelt confirmed that planning about a possible sequel to Free Fall was underway. In late 2016, the website freefall2.com was launched to inform the audience about the conception of a potential sequel. Independent producers kurhaus productions are planning to produce a sequel Free Fall 2 with the same main cast and Stephen Lacant as director. The projected budget of three million Euros will be financed by crowdfunding. The campaign began on March 19, 2017 on Indiegogo.

References

External links

  
  

  
  
  
  

2013 films
2013 LGBT-related films
2013 romantic drama films
Films shot in Germany
Gay-related films
German LGBT-related films
German romantic drama films
LGBT-related romantic drama films
Male bisexuality in film
2010s German films